Khezrabad is a city in Yazd Province, Iran.

Khezrabad or Khezerabad or Khazarabad may also refer to:
 Khezrabad, East Azerbaijan
 Khezrabad, Kerman
 Khezrabad, Kermanshah
 Khezrabad, Mazandaran
 Khezrabad, Kashmar, Razavi Khorasan Province
 Khezrabad, West Azerbaijan
 Khezerabad, Zanjan
 Khezrabad District, in Yazd Province